Mansur is a given name and a surname.

Mansur may also refer to:

 Mansur, Dharwad, a village in Dharwad district, Karnataka, India
 Mansur, North Khorasan, a village in Ziarat Rural District, Central District of Shirvan County, North Khorasan Province, Iran
 Mansur, Qazvin, a village in Kharaqan-e Gharbi Rural District, Central District of Avaj County, Qazvin Province, Iran
 Mansur, Yazd,  a village in Allahabad Rural District, Zarach District, Yazd County, Yazd Province, Iran
 Mansur, Astrakhan Oblast, Russia
 Mansur (crater), a crater on Mercury

See also
 Al-Mansur (disambiguation)
 Shah Mansur
 Manzur
 Mansour (disambiguation)
 Mansoor (wrestler)